Tijana Korent (née Tkalčec; born 27 April 1989) is a Croatian artistic gymnast. She is a vault specialist, and she qualified for the vault event finals at the 2020 and 2013 European Championships. In 2013, she became the first Croatian female gymnast to qualify for an event final at the European Championships.

Personal life 
Tijana Korent was born on 27 April 1989, in Čakovec. Her mother put her into gymnastics classes at the age of four. She has a degree in sports management from the Polytechnic of Medimurje in Cakovec, and she speaks English in addition to Croatian. She wants to become a gymnastics judge after she retires. She currently works as an accountant, and she frequently volunteers at a cat shelter.

Career 
She competed at the 2006 World Championships where she finished 121st in the all-around with a score of 48.600. In 2007, she injured her ankle and could not compete for two years. She competed at the 2011 World Championships where she finished 18th on vault in the qualification round.

At the 2013 European Championships, she qualified to the vault event final where she finished in 8th place with a score of 13.183. This was the first time that a Croatian female gymnast had qualified for an event final at the European Championships.

During the 2019 FIG World Cup series, she won the bronze medal on vault at the World Cup in Mersin, Turkey, and the silver medal on vault at the World Cup in Guimaraes, Portugal. She qualified for the vault event final at the 2020 World Cup in Baku before the event finals were canceled due to COVID-19.

She competed at the 2020 European Championships along with Ana Đerek, Christina Zwicker, Tina Zelčić, and Petra Furač. The team finished in 6th place, and Korent finished 8th in the vault final.

At the 2022 European Championships in Munich, Korent finished sixteenth on vault during the qualification round.

References 

1989 births
Living people
Croatian female artistic gymnasts
Sportspeople from Čakovec
Gymnasts at the 2022 Mediterranean Games
Mediterranean Games competitors for Croatia
20th-century Croatian women
21st-century Croatian women